Mark S. Polhemus (October 14, 1860 – November 14, 1923) nicknamed "Humpty Dumpty", was a Major League Baseball player.

Polhemus started the 1887 season with Haverhill of the New England League. He hit .456 in 51 games and was then acquired by the major league Indianapolis Hoosiers. However, he hit and fielded poorly and only saw action in 20 games for the Hoosiers.

In 1888, he went back to the New England League with the Lowell Chippies. He hit .301 and led the Chippies with 14 home runs in just 75 games. In 1889, he played for the New Orleans Pelicans of the Southern League; he had another good season at the plate, leading the league in batting average, hits, doubles, and runs scored. New Orleans won the pennant.

Polhemus played in various other minor leagues through the 1898 season.

References

External links

1860 births
1923 deaths
Sportspeople from Brooklyn
Baseball players from New York City
Major League Baseball outfielders
Indianapolis Hoosiers (NL) players
19th-century baseball players
Hazleton Pugilists players
Lowell Chippies players
Hamilton Hams players
Galveston Sand Crabs players
Spokane Bunchgrassers players
Seattle Hustlers players
Wilkes-Barre Coal Barons players
New Orleans Pelicans (baseball) players
Charleston Seagulls players
Baseball players from New York (state)